Sir Richard Wilson Jewson,  (born 5 August 1944) is a British businessman and a former Lord-Lieutenant of Norfolk.

He was educated at Rugby School and Pembroke College, Cambridge (MA).

He started work in the timber and building material supply industry and became managing director of Jewson. He was then appointed chairman of Jewson's parent company Meyer International plc, retiring in 1993. He has since held chairmanships of Archant (1997–) and Savills PLC (1994–2004). He also previously chaired the Council of the University of East Anglia.

He was appointed High Sheriff of Norfolk for 2000–01 when he lived in Barnham Broom. In 2004 he was appointed Lord-Lieutenant of Norfolk, the representative of the monarch in the county.

He was appointed a Knight Commander of the Royal Victorian Order (KCVO) in the 2019 New Year Honours list 29 December 2018.

In April 2019 he received the Freedom of the Borough from King's Lynn and West Norfolk and Great Yarmouth Borough Councils.

References

1944 births
People educated at Rugby School
Alumni of Pembroke College, Cambridge
People associated with the University of East Anglia
High Sheriffs of Norfolk
Lord-Lieutenants of Norfolk
Living people
People from Barnham Broom
English justices of the peace
Knights Commander of the Royal Victorian Order